ecare may refer to:

 ECARE, a scientific research station
 eCare (software), a software product